John Brooke Johnson Brooke (born John Brooke Johnson, 1823 – 1 December 1868)  was a soldier and Rajah Muda, heir to the Raj, of the Raj of Sarawak until disinherited in favour of his younger brother, Charles.

Born in South Stoke near Bath, the son of Francis Charles Johnson, a clergyman who had, in 1822, married Emma Frances Brooke, an elder sister of James Brooke. James took 'Johnny' on a long cruise around the Mediterranean in 1837 in his yacht, Royalist. John then joined the British Army’s 88th Foot as an Ensign in 1839, Lieutenant in 1842, and Captain in 1848.

Captain Brooke, his preferred name by then, left the 88th Foot in 1848, but did not resign his commission. He was re-assigned to serve as Aide de Camp to the Governor of Labuan James Brooke. Captain Brooke adopted the surname of Brooke on 23 May 1848 by Royal concession, and went to join his uncle in Sarawak as Rajah Muda, taking effective charge of the country when James returned to England. He spent some time in Labuan at first as James was establishing himself as its first Governor, but was subsequently based in Kuching. He has been largely ignored in the standard historical accounts of Sarawak, but substantial records survive  which show how active he was, and his engagement with pirates in the Battle off Mukah late in 1862 has attracted interest.

Brooke married Anne Grant, a granddaughter of Lord Elgin, at Kilgrastron in Scotland in 1856. They went to live in Kuching where they had two sons, Basil (1857–1860), and John Charles Evelyn Hope (1858–1934), but Anne died shortly after Hope's birth. Brooke's second marriage was to Juliana Caroline Welstead: they had met in England but married in Singapore in 1861; Julia died a year later giving birth to a daughter, Matilda Agnes (1862–1943).

Brooke died in Hounslow in 1868 after a long illness, but was buried in his father's churchyard at his childhood home of Whitelackington.

References

1823 births
1868 deaths
Sarawak royalty